Roy MacLaren may refer to:

 Roy MacLaren (footballer) (born 1930), Scottish footballer
 Roy MacLaren (politician) (born 1934), Canadian politician